Äntu lakes are group of seven lakes in Lääne-Viru County, Estonia.

Most notable of the lakes are the Blue and Green Lake because of their bluish-green colour and transparency. Lakes' bottom are covered with light-coloured lime.

Äntu lakes are:
 Valgejärv ('White Lake'), 
 Roheline or Vahejärv ('Green Lake' or 'Middle Lake') 
 Sinijärv ('Blue Lake'). 
 Linaleo Lake
 Mäetaguse Lake 
 Kaanjärv
 Umbjärv.

Near and around the lakes many hiking trails can be found.

References

Lakes of Estonia
Väike-Maarja Parish